Police Report (German: Der Polizeibericht meldet) is a 1934 German mystery crime film directed by Georg Jacoby and starring Olga Tschechowa, Paul Otto and Hansi Niese.  It was adapted from the 1932 novel Die Frau im schwarzen Schleier by Hedda Lindne.

Synopsis
The head of the company is found shot dead, not long after attempting to seduce Gisela Ostercamp the wife of his business partner. The police investigate and conclude that she is guilty of the murder. She is placed on trial but the murdered man's brother, a lawyer, takes up her case.

Cast
 Olga Tschechowa as 	Gisela Ostercamp
 Paul Otto as 	Dr. Wolf Ostercamp, ihr Mann
 Hansi Niese as 	Tante Nell, Giselas Tante
 Johannes Riemann as 	Wilbert Burkhardt, Rechtsanwalt
 Walter Steinbeck	Direktor Burkhardt, sein Bruder
 Käthe Haack as 	Anna Scheele
 Gerhard Bienert as 	Ihr Mann, ein Arbeiter
 Carl Balhaus as 	Schriftleiter
 Hugo Fischer-Köppe as 	Steppuhn, Chauffeur bei RA. Burkhardt
 Walter Gross as 	Schmidt
 Friedrich Kayßler	Vorsitzender des Gerichtes
 Carsta Löck as Mädchen bei Burkhardt
 Georg H. Schnell as Staatsanwalt
 Hans Zesch-Ballot as 	Kriminalkommissär Haupt
 Willi Schur as 	Wirt
 Betty Sedlmayr as Sängerpaar
 Leni Sponholz as Frau Schmidt, seine Frau
 Ursula van Diemen	Kyra Lindemann, Opernsängerin
 Walter von Lennep as	Sängerpaar
 Ernst Behmer		
 Eduard Bornträger		
 Arthur Grosse 		
 Charlie Kracker		
 Fritz Linn	
 Gerti Ober		
 Gustav Püttjer		
 Heinz Wemper		
 Ewald Wenck

References

Bibliography 
 Giesen, Rolf. The Nosferatu Story: The Seminal Horror Film, Its Predecessors and Its Enduring Legacy. McFarland, 2019.
 Rentschler, Eric. The Ministry of Illusion: Nazi Cinema and Its Afterlife. Harvard University Press, 1996.

External links 
 

1934 films
Films of Nazi Germany
German mystery films
1934 mystery films
German crime films
1934 crime films
1930s German-language films
Films directed by Georg Jacoby
Tobis Film films
German black-and-white films
Films based on German novels
1930s German films